Larisa Anatolievna Luzhina (born 4 March 1939) is a Soviet and Russian actress. People's Artist of the RSFSR.
In 2021, the actress revealed that when she was 19, she was harassed at work. The assistant director of the film molested her and offered to sleep with him: "spend the night with me and this will be your role". She said this information after another actress Elena Proklova said about harassment at work.

Filmography 
 1959 —  Wedding Crashers
 1961 —  Man Goes for the Sun
 1962 —  In the Seven Winds
 1962 —  Man Follows the Sun
 1963 —  Silence
 1963 —  A Free Kick
 1964 —  The Big Ore
 1965 —  Dr. Shlyutter
 1966 —  Vertical
 1969 —  Love of Serafim Frolov
 1969 —  Home of the Gentry
 1969 —  Gold
 1972 —  Racers
 1973 —  The Life on This Sinful Earth
 1973 —  Wishes
 1974 —  Conscience
 1974 —  Goaway and Twobriefcases
 1976 —  Jarosław Dąbrowski
 1976 —  The Beginning of the Legend
 1977 —  Fourth Height
 1978 —  Meeting At the End of Winter
 1978 —  Rasmus-Tramp
 1979 —  Do Not Part With Your Beloved
 1983 —  Pleads Guilty
 1985 —  Warning! All Posts...
 1986 —  Secrets of madam Wong
 1992 —  Tractor Drivers 2
 1992 —  The Price of Treasures
 2000 —  House for the Rich
 2001–2003 —  Secrets of Palace Revolutions
 2005 —  Case of Kukotskiy
 2005 —  Hunting for Red Deer
 2006 —  Love is Like Love
 2007 —  The Return of Turetsky
 2012 —  Hunting for Gauleiter
 2014 —  If You're Not With Me

References

External links

1939 births
Living people
Actresses from Saint Petersburg
Soviet film actresses
Soviet television actresses
Soviet stage actresses
Russian film actresses
Russian television actresses
Russian stage actresses
Honored Artists of the RSFSR
People's Artists of Russia
Gerasimov Institute of Cinematography alumni
Academicians of the Russian Academy of Cinema Arts and Sciences "Nika"
20th-century Russian actresses